A photographic assistant, also known as a photo assistant, photographer's assistant, or also second shooter, is "an individual with both photographic and related skills who assists a professional photographer". The work of an assistant photographer is often referred to simply as "assisting". The photo assistant is most often employed on a freelance basis, but in some instances photo assistants are full-time employees primarily in major markets and with big-name photographers. Second shooters participate in actively documenting an event by capturing more angles and cover more of the event than just one person can.

The latter will often involve assisting a studio or location photographer, not just helping out on shoots, but also carrying out the mundane day-to-day running of the studio. A freelance photo assistant will typically assist a number of different photographers on a shoot-by-shoot basis.

Previously, the main tasks of the photographic assistant would be loading and processing film (primarily 35mm, 120 and 220 roll films, & 4x5, 5x7, 8x10 and 11x14 sheet film), setting up lights, doing meter reading, and color temperature readings, shooting lighting test Polaroids, and basically presenting the photographer with a set that is ready for the photographer to simply press the button and create the images.
Now with digital having replaced traditional film photography, the photographer's assistant also needs to be a highly skilled lighting technician; as these skills are no longer being passed on by photographers, who themselves are less technically proficient than their counterparts 20 years ago.

With the onset of digital photography, the task of the assistant increasingly involves digital work, be it downloading compactflash cards or setting up the computer for digital capture. However, the traditional onset skills of lighting and metering are still the basis of the assistant's duties.

An important ongoing task of the assistant photographer, whether they work with digital or film, is setting up lighting, taking light meter readings and, generally speaking, doing all of the manual setup on a shoot.

References